Karin Juel (26 May 1900 in Kungsholmen, Stockholm – 2 May 1976 in Stockholm) was a Swedish singer, actor and writer. She originally wrote novels under the pseudonym Katherind van Goeben.

Filmography
Bachelor Father (1935)
We have heard ... (1946)
Boy in the Tree (1961)

Further reading  
 

1900 births
1976 deaths
People from Jönköping
Swedish film actresses
Swedish-language writers
20th-century Swedish actresses